Boundary Street–Newberry Cotton Mills Historic District is a national historic district located at Newberry, Newberry County, South Carolina.  The district encompasses 107 buildings, 1 site, and 1 structure in Newberry.  The district includes classical and vernacular inspired upper and middle-class houses dating from 1857–1898. It also includes a relatively intact late-19th century mill village (c. 1884-1910) that surrounded the Newberry Cotton Mill (demolished).

It was listed on the National Register of Historic Places in 1980.

References

Historic districts on the National Register of Historic Places in South Carolina
Historic districts in Newberry County, South Carolina
National Register of Historic Places in Newberry County, South Carolina
Cotton mills in the United States